Pudian Road is a station on Line 4 of the Shanghai Metro. There is also another station named Pudian Road Station on Line 6. While these two stations are situated relatively close to each other, the two stations are not interchangeable; they are located along different parts of Pudian Road.

Adjacent stations on both directions, Lancun Road station and Century Avenue station, can be used to interchange Line 6.

Service began at this station on 31 December 2005.

Bus interchange
169, 736, 995

Exit
There are four exits.

References

Shanghai Metro stations in Pudong
Line 4, Shanghai Metro
Railway stations in China opened in 2005
Railway stations in Shanghai